Beilschmiedia brevipes is an evergreen tree species in the family Lauraceae. It is endemic to Peninsular Malaysia, and is an endangered species.

It is distributed in Malaysia from Kelantan to Terengganu and Pahang. The species grows in lowland forest between the altitudes of 30 and 60 m. 
It occurs in wet and marshy locations in lowland rainforest, forests, and riverbanks.

This evergreen tree has lanceolated leaves (long: 10 cm, wide: 3 cm), the base is obtuse, the apex is acute, and the petiole is glabrous (long: 6 mm). The fruit is ellipsoid (length: 18 mm, diameter: 6 mm).

References

brevipes
Endemic flora of Peninsular Malaysia
Trees of Peninsular Malaysia
Vulnerable plants
Taxonomy articles created by Polbot